Stephan Praetorius (or Prætorius) (in Salzwedel – , in Salzwedel) was a German Lutheran theologian and pastor.

His life and work
Prætorius was born in Salzwedel, Margraviate of Brandenburg. He was educated at the University of Rostock, where he also taught in the local schools; was ordained by Agricola at Berlin in 1565; became preacher in the same year at the monastery of the Holy Ghost at Salzwedel, and soon after deacon of the Church of St. Mary's; and from 1569 until his death was pastor in Salzwedel.

A great admirer of Martin Luther, and an opponent of Jesuitism and Calvinism alike, Prætorius laid great stress on the sacraments, though not in the Roman Catholic sense, and held to justification by faith, though he also insisted on purity of life.

He was a precursor of Johann Arndt and Philipp Jakob Spener, though not Pietist in the narrow sense. His lack of caution brought upon him the charges of antinomianism and "perfectionism", the latter theory later even being called "Prætorianism". Through his tracts, published by him or his friends after 1570, Prætorius exercised an influence far beyond his own congregation. These were collected and published by Arndt under the title  (Lüneburg, 1622), containing also fourteen hymns with their melodies, one of them being "" Prætorius was also one of the few Protestant theologians of his century who exhorted the Christianity to comply with the worldwide proclamation of the Gospel.

Prætorius' tracts were later arranged in the form of dialogues, with certain moderations, by M. Statius in his  (Lüneburg, 1636, and often). There arose over his writings the Prætorian controversy, Abraham Calovius assailing the view of Prætorius and Statius that the faithful possess salvation not only in prospect but in reality. Despite all this, Prætorius' writings were continually read, and in the second quarter of the 17th century they influenced a circle of converts in Cottbus and its vicinity. Spener frequently alludes to him admiringly, and the  has been revised by the Kornthal pastor J. H. Stoudt (Stuttgart, 1869).

References

External links

1536 births
1603 deaths
16th-century German male writers
16th-century German Protestant theologians
German Lutheran theologians
German male non-fiction writers
German Protestant Reformers
Lutheran writers
People from Salzwedel
People from the Margraviate of Brandenburg
University of Rostock alumni
16th-century Lutheran theologians
17th-century Lutheran theologians